Holy Childhood High School is a Catholic school in Kingston, Jamaica. It is a well-ranked all-girls school for academics and sports. Pupils of the institution go on to careers in, among other areas, law, business, education, medicine and the arts.

The school was named after the Child Jesus, and was founded by the Franciscan Missionary Sisters of Our Lady of Perpetual Help of Jamaica (FMS) in Jamaica. Holy Childhood High began as a private school in 1937 with 8 pupils (3 boys 5 girls the boys were later transferred to St. George's College) housed in a building near Holy Cross Rectory.  Today the school is located at 9 Skibo Avenue Kingston 10, Jamaica, West Indies. The school is operated by the Ministry of Education in Jamaica and receives financial assistance, which makes it a grant-in-aid school.

As of 2010 the student population stands at over 1700, exclusive of the Holy Childhood Institute, a private institution which caters for approximately 300 students.

The school's emblem is a shield, embedded with the school’s motto, Post Proleium Pramieum which translates to "AFTER THE BATTLE THE REWARD". The school’s colours are blue and gold.

Notable alumnae
Jacqueline Bishop, award-winning author and visual artist
Ann-Marie Campbell, executive vice-president for Home Depot
Macka Diamond,Jamaican singer and writer
Marcia Douglas, award-winning author and university professor

References

External links
Holy Childhood High School on Go Jamaica

Educational institutions established in 1929
Catholic schools in Jamaica
Girls' schools in Jamaica
Schools in Kingston, Jamaica
1929 establishments in the British Empire